CKDX-FM (88.5 MHz, Lite 88.5) is a radio station licensed to Newmarket, Ontario, Canada and serving the Greater Toronto Area. Owned by Evanov Communications (but with a 30% stake held by outside investors under numbered companies), it broadcasts a soft adult contemporary format. CKDX's studios are located on Dundas Street West in the Eatonville neighbourhood of Etobicoke, Toronto, while its transmitter is located near Aurora

History
The station was launched on February 28, 1980 as AM 1480 CKAN, broadcasting from 6 am to midnight with a hybrid easy listening/beautiful music format. The station switched to a country format in 1984. In 1986, the station switched to a Top 40 format, and in 1988 the station began broadcasting 24 hours a day.

The station shut down on March 17, 1992 due to financial problems, and resumed broadcasting on May 17 of that year when the problems were resolved. At the time of the shutdown, the station was known as Energy 1480. In December of that year, the station adopted its current CKDX callsign with an oldies/easy listening format. CKDX subsequently moved to the FM dial in 1994, branding itself as The Phoenix. Since moving to FM, the station has gone through several technical changes.

The station went through a number of format changes in the next several years, adopting a dance format again as Power 88.5 (after a brief period as 88.5 The X) on February 21, 1997 at 8 AM.  On July 19, 1999, at 5 p.m., the station returned to country as 88.5 The Kat.  On June 1, 2000, at Noon, the station flipped to a format that has never been tried in Canada before: "Rhythmic oldies" as Dancing Oldies 88.5.  By 2001, the "Dancing Oldies" format aired throughout the day, while modern dance music was broadcast at night.  It was at this point in time that the station became known as Foxy 88.5, The Dance Music Station.  This lasted until January 2002, when it flipped to adult standards while retaining the "Foxy" branding. In April 2007, the station rebranded as 88.5 The Jewel, adopting the "Jewel" branding shortly after the launch of sister station CJWL-FM in Ottawa.

In 2009, after a few years with the adult standards format, the station changed to more of an older-skewing adult contemporary format to replace CJEZ-FM (which became adult hits as CHBM-FM) as CHFI-FM's competing AC station. It was at this point that CHFI began skewing towards a younger audience for its AC format. All of the "Jewel" stations presented an adult contemporary variety of music, from artists such as Elton John, Rod Stewart, Celine Dion, The Eagles, Kelly Clarkson, James Taylor, Lady Antebellum, Adele and Michael Bublé.

88.5 The Jewel also features traditional easy listening/adult standards music on "The Lounge" program, which is simulcast on the other Jewel stations, seven days a week from 7 to 11 p.m.. This program was hosted by a revolving roster of on-air personalities from Jewel stations, playing "Music With Style", often with standards from the Great American Songbook. Frequently played artists include Louis Armstrong, Diana Krall, Gladys Knight and Frank Sinatra. Following The Lounge in the 11 p.m. hour is the "Instrumental Concert Series," a beautiful music block.

On October 1, 2021, at 7 a.m., CKDX rebranded as Lite 88.5.

References

External links
 Lite 88.5
 
 

Kdx
Newmarket, Ontario
Kdx
Kdx
Kdx
Etobicoke
Radio stations established in 1980
1980 establishments in Ontario